The 2010–11 U.S. Virgin Islands Championship was the planned 13th season of the competition, but was cancelled through the virtue of the St Thomas League canceling its season.

Table

St Croix League 

 1.Unique FC          6   5  1  0     16
 2. Helenites          6   5  0  1     15
 3.Rovers             6   4  1  1     13
 4.Prankton United    6   3  1  2     10
  .Chelsea
  .Free Will
  .Skills

St Thomas League 

 1.New Vibes          3   3  0  0      9
 2.Raymix             4   3  0  1      9
 3.Laraza             3   2  0  1      6
 4.Upsetters          4   1  0  3      3
 5.Waitikibuli        4   0  0  4      0

Tournament

References

External links

US
2010 in United States Virgin Islands sports
2011 in United States Virgin Islands sports
Soccer in the United States Virgin Islands
U.S. Virgin Islands Championship seasons